The 1902 Oklahoma Sooners football team represented the University of Oklahoma as an independent during the 1902 college football season. In their first year under head coach Mark McMahon, the Sooners compiled a 6–3 record, and outscored their opponents by a combined total of 175 to 60.

Schedule

References

Oklahoma
Oklahoma Sooners football seasons
Oklahoma Sooners football